The Bowling Green Dolomite is a geologic formation in Missouri. It preserves fossils dating back to the Silurian period.

See also

 List of fossiliferous stratigraphic units in Missouri
 Paleontology in Missouri

References

 

Silurian Missouri